Capital punishment is a legal punishment in Afghanistan. The methods used hanging and shooting or firing squad. Stoning, amputation, and flogging were used as a method for punishment, especially during the Islamic Emirate of Afghanistan (1996–2001).

Capital offences
The capital offences include the serious crimes and are governed by Sharia laws, along with civil laws. The capital offences includes:

 Adultery
 Fornication (females only)
 Murder
 Apostasy
 Arson
 Blasphemy 
 Homosexual intercourse (males only)
 Espionage
 Perjury
 Terrorism

Notable executions

 1999/2000 - A Taliban executioner executes a woman in public.
April 2004 – Abdullah Shah executed inside the Pul-e-Charkhi prison outside Kabul.
October 2007 – Fifteen prisoners were executed by shooting inside Pul-e-Charkhi prison in Kabul, including Reza Khan.
June 2011 – Two mass killers were executed by hanging in Pul-e-Charkhi prison. One of the killers was Zar Ajam, a 17-year-old from Waziristan, Pakistan, who had randomly shot dead 40 people inside a branch of Kabul Bank in Jalalabad, Afghanistan.
 November 2012 – Fourteen prisoners were hanged inside Pul-e-Charkhi prison.
 October 2014 – Five men were executed by hanging inside Pul-e-Charkhi prison. The men were accused of robbery and gang rapes.
May 2016 – Six men were executed by hanging inside Pul-e-Charkhi prison on the charges of terrorism.
 December 2022 - one man was executed in public at a crowded sports stadium in south-western Farah province. The man had confessed to murder.

See also 

 List of prisons in Afghanistan
Capital punishment by country

References

Afghanistan
Murder in Afghanistan
Law enforcement in Afghanistan
Human rights abuses in Afghanistan